Focal palmoplantar and gingival keratosis is a rare autosomal dominant disease whose clinical features, and in particular, pathologic alterations and molecular mechanisms remains to be well defined.

See also 
 Digitate dermatosis
 List of cutaneous conditions

References

External links 

Palmoplantar keratodermas